Treat Myself may refer to:

Treat Myself (album), 2020 album by Meghan Trainor
 "Treat Myself", the title track of Treat Myself by Meghan Trainor, 2018
 "Treat Myself" (song), 2020
 "Treat Myself", a song by Stevie Wonder from Conversation Peace, 1995